James Kirkwood may refer to:
James Kirkwood (Church of Scotland) (1650–1709), promoter of Scottish Gaelic language literacy
James P. Kirkwood (1807–1877), American civil engineer
James Kirkwood Sr. (1875–1963), American actor and film director
James Kirkwood Jr. (1924–1989), American playwright and author
Jimmy Kirkwood (field hockey) (born 1962), field hockey player from Northern Ireland
James Kirkwood (grammarian) (fl. 1698), Scottish grammarian
James Kirkwood (sport shooter) (born 1930), Australian Olympic shooter
James Kirkwood (politician) (1845–1933), politician in Ontario, Canada